André Giriat (20 August 1905 – 11 July 1967) was a French rower. He had his best achievements in coxed pairs, together with Anselme Brusa and coxswain Pierre Brunet, winning the national title in 1927 and 1931, the European title in 1931, and an Olympic bronze medal in 1932. He then rowed double sculls with Robert Jacquet, winning a European bronze medal in 1935 and finishing fourth at the 1936 Olympics.

Giriat won 10 French Championships: in the single scull (1925), coxed pair (1927, 1931), double scull (1935–37, 1939 and 1945) and eight (1942–43).

References

External links
 
 
 

1905 births
1967 deaths
French male rowers
Olympic rowers of France
Rowers at the 1932 Summer Olympics
Rowers at the 1936 Summer Olympics
Olympic bronze medalists for France
Olympic medalists in rowing
Medalists at the 1932 Summer Olympics
European Rowing Championships medalists
People from Villeurbanne
Sportspeople from Lyon Metropolis
20th-century French people